Ashwi Khurd is one of the villages in Sangamner Taluka in Ahmednagar District in Maharashtra State. The nearest towns are Akole, Rahata, Kopargaon, and Shrirampur
Nearest Airport is shirdi international airport (30km)
Aurangabad (140km) pune(160km)

Notable people
Indian cricketer Ajinkya Rahane was born in the village.

References

Villages in Ahmednagar district